Tulia may refer to 
Tulia, Texas,  a city in the United States
Tulia Independent School District in Tulia, Texas 
Tulia High School  in Tulia, Texas 
Tulia (given name)
Tulia (band), Polish band